Pulaski County Courthouse may refer to:

 Pulaski County Courthouse (Arkansas), Little Rock, Arkansas
 Pulaski County Courthouse (Georgia), Hawkinsville, Georgia
 Pulaski County Courthouse (Illinois), Mound City, Illinois
 Pulaski County Courthouse (Indiana), Winamac, Indiana
 Pulaski County Courthouse (Missouri), Waynesville, Missouri
 Pulaski County Courthouse (Virginia), Pulaski, Virginia